The Quezon Football Association is a Filipino football association based in Lucena in Quezon. It works under the Philippine Football Federation as provincial football association for the Quezon area.  The Quezon FA sends a team to represent the region in the yearly PFF National Men's Club Championship.

 

1977 establishments in the Philippines
Football governing bodies in the Philippines
Sports in Quezon